The 1999 Copa Libertadores Final was a two-legged football match-up to determine the 1999 Copa Libertadores champion. It was contested by Brazilian club Palmeiras and Colombian club Deportivo Cali. The first leg was played at Estadio Olímpico Pascual Guerrero in Cali while the second leg was played at Estádio Palestra Itália (also known as "Parque Antarctica") of São Paulo.

After the series finished in a 2–2 tie on aggregate, Palmeiras was crowned champion by penalty shoot-out.

Qualified teams

Venues

Route to the finals

Final summary

First leg

Second leg

References

1
Copa Libertadores Finals
Copa Libertadores Final 1999
Copa Libertadores Final 1999
Copa Libertadores Finals 1999